Philmont station is a station along the SEPTA West Trenton Line to Ewing, New Jersey. It is located at Tomlinson Road & Philmont Avenue in Lower Moreland Township, Pennsylvania. In FY 2013, Philmont station had a weekday average of 633 boardings and 574 alightings.  The station has off-street parking and a ticket office. Philmont station was built in 1913 by the Reading Railroad after the previous depot caught fire on March 17 of that year.

Station layout
Philmont has two low-level side platforms with a mini high-level platform.

References

External links
SEPTA - Philmont Station
 Station from Pine Road from Google Maps Street View

SEPTA Regional Rail stations
Former Reading Company stations
Railway stations in Montgomery County, Pennsylvania